Beatriz Feres and Branca Feres (born February 22, 1988 in Brazil) are Brazilian synchronized swimmers, models, and actresses. They are identical twins.

Swimming
The Feres sisters started practicing swimming and gymnastics at the age of three, and began synchronized swimming at the age of seven. They were champions of Brazil in both juvenile and adult categories, and reached second place in the 2005 Pan American Junior Games in Orlando.

The Feres sisters competed for Brazil in the 2007 Pan American Games in synchronized swimming and won a bronze medal. They were both part of the team that won the gold medal at the 2010 South American Games for women's team synchronized swimming. They were also both part of the Brazilian team that competed in the Women's team synchronized swimming at the 2016 Summer Olympics.

Modeling and acting
The Feres sisters are also models and have appeared in a number of photo shoots, including one for Brazilian magazine VIP in July 2008, where they appeared on the cover.

References

External links
 
 

Living people
1988 births
Brazilian synchronized swimmers
Brazilian female models
Brazilian actresses
Synchronized swimmers at the 2007 Pan American Games
Synchronized swimmers at the 2015 Pan American Games
Identical twin actresses
Brazilian twins
Twin sportspeople
Olympic synchronized swimmers of Brazil
Synchronized swimmers at the 2016 Summer Olympics
South American Games gold medalists for Brazil
South American Games medalists in synchronized swimming
Competitors at the 2010 South American Games
Pan American Games medalists in synchronized swimming
Pan American Games bronze medalists for Brazil
Medalists at the 2007 Pan American Games